James Diers is a writer and musician in Minneapolis, Minnesota. He is a founding member of the bands Halloween, Alaska and Love-cars. (He collaborates with drummer and composer David King in both groups.) He is known for writing literate, thought-provoking lyrics in a modern indie rock context. Diers attended Northwestern University in Evanston, Illinois and the University of Sussex in England.

Discography

with Halloween, Alaska

Albums
 Le Centre, 2018
 All Night the Calls Came In, 2011 (voice/guitar/production)
 Champagne Downtown, 2009 (voice/guitar/keys/production)
 Too Tall to Hide, 2005 (voice/guitar/keys/production)
 Halloween, Alaska, 2004 (voice/guitar/production)

EPs
 Liberties, 2013 (voice/keyboards/guitar)

Appearances
 Twin Town High Music Yearbook Vol. 8, 2007
 For Callum, 2007 
 Live Current Vol. 1, 2005

with Love-Cars

Albums
 Thank You For Telling Me What I Already Know, 2002 (voice/guitar/keys)
 I'm Friends With All Stars, 2000 (voice/guitar)
 Chump Lessons, 1998 (voice/guitar)

Appearances
 Twin Town Music Yearbook Vol. 4, 2001 
 Twin Town Music Yearbook Vol. 2, 1998

Other Contributions
 JG Everest, Parade, 2008 (voice/guitar)
 Fat Kid Wednesdays, The Art of Cherry, 2005 (voice on "All Thru the Night")
 12 Rods, Lost Time, 2002 (additional voice)

References 

Living people
Year of birth missing (living people)